Sergei Mikhailovich Volnukhin (1859–1921) was a Russian sculptor, best known for his instruction to a generation of Russian artists at the Moscow School of Painting, Sculpture and Architecture, teaching alongside Prince Paolo Troubetzkoy.

Among Volnukhin's students:

 Anna Golubkina (1889-1890)
 Sergey Konenkov (1892-1896)
 Nikolay Andreyev (1892-1901)
 Alexander Matveyev (1899-1902)
 Natalia Goncharova (1901-1904)
 Stepan Erzia (1902-1906)
 Aleksei Babichev (1907-1912)
 Boris Korolev (circa 1910)
Isaac Itkind (1912-1913)
 Arkady Plastov (1914-1917)

Notable among his own work is the 1909 monument to Ivan Fyodorov in Moscow (with architect Ivan Mashkov.)  Volnukhin's papers are held at the Tretyakov Gallery.

References 

1859 births
1921 deaths
19th-century sculptors from the Russian Empire
19th-century male artists from the Russian Empire
20th-century Russian sculptors
20th-century Russian male artists
Russian male sculptors
Academic staff of the Moscow School of Painting, Sculpture and Architecture